NFL Slimetime is an American weekly television sports show that premiered on Nickelodeon on September 15, 2021. The show focuses on the National Football League (NFL), and airs throughout the NFL season.

Production
On September 10, 2021, ViacomCBS announced that it would air a weekly NFL series on Nickelodeon and Paramount+, NFL Slimetime, hosted by Nate Burleson and Dylan Gilmer (of the Nickelodeon series Tyler Perry's Young Dylan).

On August 31, 2022, it was announced that the series was renewed for a second season, which premiered on September 14, 2022.

Format
NFL Slimetime features highlights and game footage that recaps the previous week's NFL action. Just like with Nickelodeon's first live NFL telecast on January 10, 2021 (the NFC Wild Card playoff game between the Chicago Bears and New Orleans Saints), these highlights are flavored with digital, comic strip-like animation such as white smoke, green slime, and blue lightning. Players were given superimposed googly eyes and hamburger hats. Other recurring segments include Dylan Schefter (the daughter of ESPN NFL reporter Adam Schefter) interviewing one particular player each week and commentary by George Johnston IV in a segment called "George Knows Football". 

For the 2021 season, NFL Slimetime featured a "Fantasy Showdown" segment, where each week, a new celebrity challenged Burleson and Gilmer to a game of fantasy football. For the 2022 season, the "Fantasy Showdown" segment was replaced by "Celebrity Pick Party", keeping the same format as Fantasy Showdown, but instead of picking players to form a team, the celebrity and Team Slimetime will pick winners from the different games each week. The weekly winner of "Celebrity Pick Party" reserves the right to wear the "Slime Chain", an oversized NFL Slimetime logo studded in colored rhinestones.

NVP Award
Following Nickelodeon's first live NFL broadcast, the network brought back the NVP award for each episode, based on a player's performance the previous week and announced by Lincoln Loud (voiced by Asher Bishop, then Bentley Griffin, and portrayed by Wolfgang Schaeffer in Week 12 in 2021), the main protagonist of The Loud House. Starting with the Week 11 episode during the 2022 season, Lincoln Loud was replaced by Nate Wright (voiced by Ben Giroux), from the Paramount+ series Big Nate. Lincoln Loud returned as NVP announcer for Week 22.

Kyler Murray was the first winner of the weekly NVP. Other winners during the 2021 season have included the participating quarterbacks in Super Bowl LV, Tom Brady and Patrick Mahomes, and Justin Tucker, whose record-setting 66-yard field goal led the Baltimore Ravens to victory in Week 3.

2021 Weekly NVP winners

2022 Weekly NVP winners

Notes
1. Nickelodeon pre-empted the Week 17 recap scheduled for January 4, 2023, following Damar Hamlin's injury on Monday Night Football two days earlier.

References

External links
 
  

2020s Nickelodeon original programming
2021 American television series debuts
National Football League television series
English-language television shows